Apo Hikers is an adventure story arc of the Philippine comic strip series Pugad Baboy, created by Pol Medina Jr. and originally published in the Philippine Daily Inquirer. This particular story arc lasts 62 strips long. In 1999, the story arc was reprinted in Pugad Baboy XI, the eleventh book compilation of the comic strip series.

Synopsis

The story arc begins in Kidapawan City, North Cotabato, which sits at the foot of Mount Apo, the highest mountain peak in the Philippines. Staff monitoring the volcano are alarmed when they feel tremors shaking the station. Thinking that Mount Apo is about to erupt, they report to their superior who reassures them, saying that the tremors they are experiencing are caused by the residents of Pugad Baboy, who are on a hiking trip up the mountain.

The hike
The Pugad Baboy gang are well-prepared to hike up the mountain slopes: Tomas is in charge of the first aid kit, Ka Noli has the emergency radio, Polgas has the survival gear, Bab has the thermal wear and most importantly, Dagul has the food provisions. They also have the services of a guide, Mel, who gives them a few survival tips, such as falling on one's back so that the backpack absorbs the impact of the fall. Mel also has a pet Bobcat who accompanies the party as they hike up the mountain.

The hiking party soon reach Lake Agko, the waters of which are hazy with steam from the volcano. Mel reminds them that it is not possible to swim in its waters. As they reach the Marbel River, Mel informs them that at this point, warm and cool waters meet, and being sulphuric in nature, the water is good for the skin. Polgas soon hears rushing water and opines that there must be a waterfall near their location. Mel confirms this and tells them that they will be passing by the waterfall when they return from the peak. At 8,000 feet from sea level, they reach Lake Venado. Night soon falls and the party sets up camp. In the morning, they prepare for a three-hour hike to the mountain's peak. At 10, 311 feet, they reach one of the eight peaks of Mount Apo. Mel shows them the volcano's old crater, which is filled with blueberry bushes. Mel also points out a protrusion called Anak ni Apo (Filipino for Son of Apo), probably a part of the volcano under of which is an active magma vein. Returning from the peak, the gang discovers that their food provisions are all gone, and Mel, who has been trained by the Manobo tribesmen in survival tactics, takes it upon himself to forage for food. He finds some young fern leaves and makes a salad out of it. Bobcat catches a deer and turns the meat into native jerky. After the meal, they resume their trek down the mountain.

Illegal loggers
Soon they reach the waterfall Polgas heard they previous day. Noli and Tomas discover that there is a cave behind the waterfall; they decide to explore it. As it was dark inside the cave, the pair blundered and fell into a deep pit inside the cave. They slid down until they emerged at an exit at the other side of the mountain. Concerned for the safety of Tomas and Noli, Polgas went after the pair, leaving the rest of the hiking party. After he was gone, two goons from an illegal logging operation in the area took Mel, Bab, Dagul and Pao hostage. It is soon revealed that the illegal loggers were floating the purloined logs down the river and a hidden drawbridge under the waterfall caught and channeled the logs and water into the cave Tomas, Noli and Polgas went into. The goons also reveal that there are only eight of them, but that they had thirty manobo tribesmen working for them; the tribesmen's families were their hostages as well.

As Polgas reached the spot where Tomas and Noli fell, he was surprised by the water and logs that had been channeled into the cave. He rode the flood out and emerged in the same spot where Tomas and Noli had finally fallen, using his backpack as a makeshift parachute. Meanwhile, Bobcat managed to disarm the two goons holding the rest of the gang hostage. The two separated groups were soon able to communicate with each other using Mel's cellular phone and Polgas' garapata gun (which has a built-in satellite phone). Mel relates the story regarding the hostaged Manobo's families and they come up with a plan to rescue them. As Mel was about to call the armed forces in Kidapawan, two more members of the illegal loggers' gang attempted to subdue them, however, Dagul, Bab and Pao managed to disarm these goons as well. The Manobos, however, pursued the Pugad Baboy gang, who fled even though they were now armed with the illegal loggers' weapons, since they did not wish to harm the native tribesmen who were simply pressed into service for fear of their families' lives.

Dobermaxx makes an appearance
Meanwhile, Polgas, Tomas and Noli have located the Manobo village where the tribesmen's families were being held hostage. Polgas changes into his Dobermaxx persona and deploys Gary, his fleabot, who functions as a spotter and scout. With Gary's help, Dobermaxx soon determines that there were three goons guarding the Manobos' families, one at the well, one in the latrine and the last up in a tree near Gary's position. They planned to disable the three goons simultaneously; Noli would take care of the goon near the well, Tomas the one in the latrine and Dobermaxx the last up in the tree. They did this successfully with Gary giving the signal to attack.

Having disarmed the three goons, Dobermaxx calls Mel; Mel and the rest of the Pugad Baboy gang are up in the trees, hiding from the Manobo tribesmen. Dobermaxx explains that to make the tribesmen believe that their families were now safe, he was going to take a video of the village and the women and children. He was then going to upload this video into Mel's website and Mel was to show the Manobos the video using his laptop. Tomas suggests that it would be better to show the tribesmen's mothers-in-law as well. The plan works; the Manobos see that their families are safe and to their utmost joy, that their mothers-in-law now seem imprisoned in the little black box (Mel's laptop). Mel calls the Kidapawan police, who immediately set out for the slopes of the mountain to place the goons under arrest.

Hostaged Philippine eagles
The goons' leader, however, makes an appearance with his own hostages - Philippine eagles named Pete and Jeffrey. He warns the Pugad Baboy gang that if they come thin fifty meters, he was going to stab the eagles with the arrows he was holding. Dagul asks for Mel's phone and tells Dobermaxx of the situation. Dobermaxx suspects that the goons' leader would pass his way as he attempted to escape. He tells Dagul to hold the phone to Bobcat's ear as he had a plan. He retrieves Gary and waits in an ambush position for the eagle poaching leader. He soon spots the villain. He also sees that Bobcat was now in position for their plan to work. He fires Gary from his wrist-spitter; Gary lands on one of the eagle's cages. The fleabot begins to distract the poacher. The villain thinking that one of the eagles is talking, stops in his tracks. Dobermaxx swings from a tree and grabs Bobcat. Bobcat unsheathes his claws and as they pass over the eagle cages being carried by the poacher, slashes the top of the cages open. The eagles, finding themselves free, spread their wings and escaped. The leader now finds himself with no hostages to bargain with. In desperation, he warns the Pugad Baboy gang not to come near or he was going to strangle himself; later he threatens to jump off a cliff. Bab actually pushes him over. At the bottom of the cliff, Dobermaxx asks Bobcat to shave the poacher's mustache off. Dobermaxx then recognizes his arch-enemy, Atong Damuho. The Kidapawan police arrive and take the goons off to prison.

Epilogue
Polgas and the rest of the gang visit the Philippine Eagle Nature Center, where they get the news that the equipment left by the illegal loggers at the waterfall had now been dismantled and that Pete and Jeffrey were doing well. Mel sees that the hikers were ready for the trip home; their backpacks were full again. Dagul explains that these contained gifts for the family back home - fruits such as marang, mangosteen, durian, suha (pomelo) and rambutan. Tomas has waling-waling orchid roots for his wife. Bab mentions that he has bariles for pulutan; fish parts such as roe, jaw and tail. The rest of the gang tell him that those items were not permitted on board the plane and that they'd better eat it right there and then (with a generous serving of beer, of course). During the drinking session, Polgas has everyone pose for a group picture with Mount Apo in the background, with Gary clicking the shutter.

Trivia
 Kidapawan City's location was mislocated at South Cotabato, but actually the capital of Cotabato Province.
 Bobcat was based on bobcat, a wild feline specie.
 Catching Philippine Eagles is illegal upon Philippine Law.
 Atong Damuho made appearance once again.
 Blueberries was growing in higher altitudes in Mount Apo.

Pugad Baboy